Kamal Merchant (born 2 December 1956) is a former Pakistani domestic cricketer, coach and umpire. In 2021, he was granted Irish citizenship.

Playing career
Merchant played in 95 first class games in his career from 1974–1998. He scored 2927 runs at an average of 27.10 with 12 50s and 1 hundred. Merchant was far more successful as a bowler where he took 118 wickets at an average of 23.80 and an economy rate of 2.17 with his best figures being 6/69.

Coaching career
While playing domestic cricket in Pakistan, Merchant also played in the Northern Cricket Union of Ireland for nine years from 1984. After retiring, Merchant went back to Ireland and started coaching youth teams. Future Ireland international Harry Tector, credited Merchant with helping him in his development. In 2013, Merchant's work was acknowledged with him being nominated for coach of the year.

Umpiring career
In addition to coaching after retiring, Merchant also became an umpire. He was scheduled to umpire in a ODI between Pakistan and Sri Lanka but did not for unknown reasons. However Merchant did umpire in a Women's ODI between Pakistan and South Africa. Merchant also stood in many important domestic games, for example the 2013-14 National T20 Cup final, where Merchant was criticized for an incorrect decision against Umar Akmal. In light of this, Merchant was backed by former Pakistan batsman and captain Javed Miandad who said that he should be backed because of his knowledge of the game and his quality of making fair judgements.

Personal life
Merchant has four daughters with his wife Najma. In February 2021, he was granted Irish citizenship.

References

1956 births
Pakistani cricketers
Pakistani cricket umpires
Pakistani cricket coaches
Living people
Pakistani expatriates in Ireland